Abukuma may refer to:

Places in Japan:
Abukuma River
Abukuma Highlands
Abukuma-do, limestone caves in Fukushima, Japan
Abukuma Express Line, a railroad line
Abukuma Station
Japanese cruiser Abukuma, a World War II cruiser of the Imperial Japanese Navy

ja:阿武隈